Wilhelm Depenau (1884-1952) was a German art director.

Selected filmography
 The Most Beautiful Woman in the World (1924)
 Come Back, All Is Forgiven (1929)
 Viennese Waltz (1932)
 The Love Hotel (1933)
 The Double (1934)
 Little Dorrit (1934)
 The Young Count (1935)
 The Red Rider (1935)
 She and the Three (1935)
 The Blonde Carmen (1935)
 Knockout (1935)
 Ninety Minute Stopover (1936)
 Water for Canitoga (1939)
 Detours to Happiness (1939)
 The Fox of Glenarvon (1940)
 My Life for Ireland (1941)
 Street Acquaintances (1948)
 Don't Dream, Annette (1949)
 The Last Year (1951)
 Eyes of Love (1951)

References

Bibliography
 Reid, John Howard. Science-fiction & Fantasy Cinema: Classic Films of Horror, Sci-fi & The Supernatural. 2007.

External links

1884 births
1952 deaths
German art directors